Khunapakan was the name of a medieval district in the Sasanian province of Pars. It is mentioned as a district of the administrative division of Ardashir-Khwarrah in the Madigan-i Hezar Dadistan.

Sources 

Sasanian cities
History of Fars Province